Louis Wiley "Billy" Devore (12 September 1910, St. John, Kansas – 12 August 1985, Indianapolis, Indiana) was an American racecar driver. He was the son of pre-war Indy driver Earl Devore.

Indy 500 results

Complete Formula One World Championship results
(key)

References

1910 births
1985 deaths
Indianapolis 500 drivers
People from St. John, Kansas
Racing drivers from Kansas